John Mooney may refer to:

John Mooney (activist) (born 1966), American activist, Vice-President of Transport Workers Union in New York City
John Mooney (basketball) (born 1998), American basketball player
John Mooney (cricketer) (born 1982), Irish cricketer
John Mooney (historian) (1862–1950), Scottish historian, founder of the Orkney Antiquarian Society
John Mooney (musician) (born 1955), American blues guitarist based in New Orleans, Louisiana
John Mooney (canoeist) (born 1964), American sprint canoer
John J. Mooney (1929–2020), American chemical engineer who was co-inventor of the three-way catalytic converter
John J. Mooney (horse racing) (1924–1994), Canadian horse racing executive
Sir John Mooney (Irish politician) (1874–1934), Irish politician, Member of Parliament for South County Dublin 1900–1906, and Newry 1906–1918
Johnny Mooney (footballer) (1926–2000), Scottish footballer
Johnny Mooney (born 1958), Irish Gaelic footballer
Jackie Mooney (1938–2017), Irish soccer player
J. D. Mooney (died 1966), American jockey and trainer
John Mooney (Canadian politician) (1933–2003), Canadian politician
John David Mooney, Chicago-based artist